Edith Márquez Landa (born 27 January 1973) is a Mexican singer and actress.

Life
She is a dramatic mezzo-soprano.

She started her professional career by winning the television musical contests "Juguemos a cantar" (1978) and "Canta, Canta" (1984). She later attended some courses in the Artistic Educational Training Centre of Televisa and she was a member of the musical band Timbiriche.

She has taken part in several soap operas and she represented Mexico in 2001 Viña del Mar International Song Festival.

In 2003, she became the first member of Timbiriche to have her handprints imbedded onto the Paseo de las Luminarias in her hometown of Mexico City.  Her handprints were imbedded for her work in television and as a recording artist.

Television

Discography

 1987, Timbiriche VIII & IX, Melody (Mexico)
 1989, Los Clásicos de Timbiriche, Melody (Mexico)
 1990, Timbiriche 10, Melody (Mexico)
 1998, Frente a Ti, Warner Music & ARDC Music Division USA
 2000, Caricias del Cielo, Warner Music (Mexico)
 2001, Extravíate, Warner Music (Mexico)
 2003, ¿Quién Te Cantará?, Warner Music (Mexico)
 2005, Cuando Grita La Piel, Warner Music (Mexico)
 2007, Memorias del Corazón, EMI Music (Mexico)
 2008, Pasiones de Cabaret, EMI Music (Mexico)
 2008, En Concierto desde el Metropólitan (CD), Warner Music (Mexico)
 2009, Duele, EMI Music(México), ARDC Music Division USA
 2011, Amar No ES Suficiente, Sony Music (Mexico)
 2011,   "No Te Preocupes Por Mi"
 2012, Mi Error, Mi Fantasía, (Edición Especial 2 CD's + DVD) Sony Music (México) and Televisa Música (México)
 2013, Emociones, Sony Music (México)
2018, Contigo, Universal Music (México)

External links 
Official website 

1973 births
Living people
Mexican mezzo-sopranos
Mexican film actresses
Mexican telenovela actresses
Mexican stage actresses
Mexican child actresses
Mexican pop singers
Timbiriche members
Singers from Mexico City
Actresses from Mexico City
21st-century Mexican singers
21st-century Mexican women singers
Universal Music Latin Entertainment artists